The Savinja and Šalek Valley is a region in northern Slovenia, close to the border with Austria.

Municipalities: Gornji Grad, Solčava, Rečica ob Savinji, Ljubno ob Savinji, Luče, Nazarje, Šmartno ob Paki, Mozirje, Šoštanj, and Velenje.

The main tourist destinations in the area:
Nature Parks: the Logar Valley, the Roban Cirque, the Matk Cirque, Golte
Golte ski and hiking area
Solčava Panoramic Road
City of Velenje
Topolšica Spa

Natural wonders and cultural sights

See also
Velenje
Savinja River
Šalek Valley
Logar Valley
Solčava

Valleys of Slovenia